András Béres (1924 – 14 November 1993) was a Hungarian football manager and player.  He used to coach R.S.C. Anderlecht and Club Brugge among others.

External links
Profile at club Brugge
Biography

1924 births
1993 deaths
Footballers from Budapest
Hungarian footballers
Association football forwards
Hungarian expatriate footballers
Budapest Honvéd FC players
Csepel SC footballers
Vasas SC players
Expatriate footballers in the Netherlands
FC Twente players
HVV Tubantia players
Hungarian expatriate sportspeople in the Netherlands
Expatriate footballers in Luxembourg
CA Spora Luxembourg players
Hungarian expatriate sportspeople in Luxembourg
Hungarian football managers
Hungarian expatriate football managers
CA Spora Luxembourg managers
Expatriate football managers in Luxembourg
Beerschot A.C. managers
Expatriate football managers in Belgium
R.S.C. Anderlecht managers
K. Berchem Sport managers
R.W.D.M. Brussels F.C. managers
Club Brugge KV head coaches
Venezuela national football team managers
Expatriate football managers in Venezuela
Hungarian expatriate sportspeople in Venezuela
20th-century Hungarian people